Sheikha Alanoud bint Hamad bin Khalifa Al Thani is a Qatari royal and businesswoman. She serves on the board of directors of the Qatar Financial Centre and was appointed as the centre's chief business officer and deputy chief executive officer in 2023. Prior to her appointment, she served as managing director of business development at the centre, launching initiatives to promote employment throughout the COVID-19 pandemic in Qatar. Sheikha Alanoud was the first woman and youngest person to be appointed to the centre's executive committee. In March 2021, she was named a Young Global Leader by the World Economic Forum. In 2022, she was a recipient of the Arab Woman of the Year Award and was named by Forbes as one of the 50 Most Powerful Businesswomen in the Middle East and North Africa.

A member of the Qatari royal family, Sheikha Alanoud is the daughter of Sheikh Hamad bin Khalifa Al Thani, who reigned as Emir of Qatar until 2013, and the half sister of the current Emir, Sheikh Tamim bin Hamad Al Thani, and sister of Deputy Emir, Sheikh Abdullah bin Hamad bin Khalifa Al Thani.

Family 
Sheikha Alanoud bint Hamad bin Khalifa Al Thani is the daughter of Sheikh Hamad bin Khalifa Al Thani, who reigned as the Emir of Qatar from 1995 to 2013, and of Sheikha Noora bint Khalid Al Thani. Her mother is also her father's first cousin and the daughter of Sheikh Khalid bin Hamad bin Abdullah Al Thani, the former Qatari Minister of the Interior. Sheikha Alanoud is the sister of Sheikh Khalid bin Hamad Al Thani, Sheikh Thani bin Hamad bin Khalifa Al Thani, and Deputy Emir Sheikh Abdullah bin Hamad bin Khalifa Al Thani. She is a half-sister of the current Emir, Sheikh Tamim bin Hamad Al Thani.

Education 
She attended the London School of Economics and the University of Oxford and has an executive education degree from the Qatar Leadership Centre Rising Leaders Program.

Career
Sheikha Alanoud began working at the Qatar Financial Centre in 2016. She first served as Vice President of Strategic Alliances at the chief executive officer's Office and, soon after, was appointed as associate director of Economic Affairs for the Middle East and North Africa. In 2017, she was appointed managing director of Business Development, serving in that capacity throughout the COVID-19 pandemic in Qatar. During her tenure, she worked to improve employment and job security in Qatar. In 2023, Sheikha Alanoud was appointed Chief Business Officer and Deputy Chief Executive Officer of the Qatar Financial Centre, heading the Business Development and Client Affairs departments. She is the first woman, and youngest person, to serve on the centre's executive committee.

Sheikha Alanoud formerly served as the Qatar Country Director for Silatech, a social initiative that provides employment opportunities for young people throughout the Arab World. She has been on the board of various organizations, including Tomouh, How Women Work, i2Co School of Transformative Leadership, Qatar-UK Alumni Board – British Council, and Future Foregin Policy in the United Kingdom. She has also been Vice Chair of the Bedaya Centre for Entrepreneurship and Career Guidance, Qatar Chair for Global Dignity, and a Global Ambassador for Qatar for Women's Entrepreneurship Day.

In March 2021, Sheikha Alanoud was selected as a Young Global Leader by the World Economic Forum, making her the youngest Young Global Leader and the only Qatari to receive the award that year. She was also named a Global Shaper by the Forum.

Awards 
Sheikha Alanoud is a two time recipient of His Highness Sheikh Tamim bin Hamad Al-Thani Education Excellence Award, receiving the award in 2008 and 2012. In 2011, she was a recipient of the Young Arab Achiever award. In 2022, Forbes recognized her as one of the Middle East's 50 Most Powerful Businesswomen in MENA. In 2022, she was awarded the Arab Woman of the Year Award for achievements in financial services.

References 

Living people
Alumni of the London School of Economics
Alumni of the University of Oxford
Daughters of monarchs
House of Thani
Islamic banking
Qatari bankers
Qatari business executives
Qatari Muslims
Qatari royalty
Qatari women
Women corporate directors
Women corporate executives
Women in finance
Year of birth missing (living people)